The Alchemy Arms Spectre is a semi-automatic pistol chambered in .45 ACP. The Spectre’s function and aesthetics are influenced by two prominent and proven pistol designs – the M1911 and the Glock. It was produced in unknown quantities before its manufacturing company – Alchemy Arms, Co. – succumbed to financial pressures and was abandoned in 2006.

The Spectre remains a weapon of both mystery and controversy. Quality control was poor; many of the guns were delivered with missing magazines, for instance. The magazines were very hard to find, as they were custom-made, based on the magazine of the .45 ACP EAA Witness.

Background
The Spectre is an aesthetic hybrid between the Colt M1911 and Glock pistol designs. While no parts are interchangeable with the M1911, several parts – such as the slide, barrel, and recoil spring – are interchangeable with certain Glock models. While advertised to be chambered in three, separate calibers – .45 ACP, .40 S&W, and 9×19mm Parabellum – production models are only known to have been chambered in .45 ACP, with very few prototype models in .40 S&W. All models of the Spectre feature a match-grade 416 Stainless Steel barrel, 7075-T6 billet aluminum frame, and 20lpi scalloped slide serrations and grip contours.

The pistol was advertised as “the safest pistol on the market”, due its five separate safety systems, four of which are in wide use by other firearm designs:

There is a frame mounted manual safety…a “high grip” safety of the beavertail type…a drop safety that prevents the firing pin from disengaging until the trigger is fully depressed…a firing pin block that disable the firing pin until external safeties are disengaged and the trigger is fully depressed…

And one safety unique to the Spectre line of pistols:

…a “keyed internal-locking device” that is built into the bottom of the grip…operated with a security key and renders the firearm completely inoperable when set…to render the gun safe when stored and not in use…

Despite its innovative features and “safe” design, the company which produced the pistol – Alchemy Arms, Co. – ran into financial troubles within a few years’ time and was abandoned, delaying further production and service to the Spectre line of pistols indefinitely.

Variants
 Standard Issue (SI): was a series of high use or tactical pistols that specifically featured a black oxide finish and a tactical picatinny-style mounting rail, located at the front of the receiver.
 Service Grade (SG): was a series of soft line pistols for professional carry or concealed carry, and featured a silver coating.
 Service Grade Commander (SGC): shared the unique design features of the full-size SG series, with a shorter overall length of 6.5 in, barrel length of 4 in, and lighter weight of 27 oz.
 Titanium Edition (TI): was the lightest version of the full-size Spectre, weighing 24 oz unloaded. It featured a lightweight Titanium slide assembly and an Olive Drab “Milspec” receiver.
 Titanium Edition Commander (TIC): shared the unique design features of the full-size TI series, with a shorter overall length of 6.5 in, barrel length of 4 in, and lighter weight of 22 oz.

References

.45 ACP semi-automatic pistols
Semi-automatic pistols of the United States
Short recoil firearms